The Tellico salamander (Plethodon aureolus) is a small woodland salamander resembling Plethodon glutinosus found in mountainous and lowland regions of southeastern Tennessee and extreme southwestern North Carolina. Little has been published on the species.

Appearance 
It has a grayish-black or black dorsum with brassy spotting.  The chin is light-coloured and the sides have more concentrated yellow or white spotting. Rounded in cross section, the maximum size for adults is 151 mm from tip of the snout to tip of the tail.

Reproduction 
Sexually active males have circular mental glands just behind the chin.  The courtship ritual performed is indistinguishable from P. glutinosus.  It ends with the deposition of a spermatophore by the male which is picked up by the female's cloacal lips. Chemical cues are important in species recognition and prevention of interbreeding with P. oconaluftee.  Males seem to prefer the odor of female conspecifics, while females tend to prefer the odor of male heterospecifics.

References

Further reading
 Petranka, James W. (1998) Salamanders of the United States and Canada, Washington and London: Smithsonian Institution Press.
 Amphibian Species of the World

Plethodon
Amphibians described in 1983